Galu Bagh (also Romanized as Galū Bāgh and Galoo Bagh; also known as Gūleh Bāghak and Gulu-i-Bāghak) is a village in Doreh Rural District, in the Central District of Sarbisheh County, South Khorasan Province, Iran. At the 2006 census, its population was 392, in 107 families.

References 

Populated places in Sarbisheh County